José Cecilio Díaz del Valle (November 22, 1780 – March 2, 1834) was a philosopher, politician, lawyer, and journalist and one of the most important figures in Central America during the transition from colonial government to independence, displaying a wide-ranging expertise in public administration management.

Valle nicknamed 'The Wise' was also, one of Central America's founding fathers.

Personal life

Early years
José Cecilio del Valle was born on November 22, 1780, in the village of Choluteca, located near the Choluteca River. This village belonged to the former province of Tegucigalpa (now Honduras), during the Spanish domination. He was the legitimate son of Jose Antonio del Valle and Gertrudis Díaz del Valle. Both members of the most distinguished Spanish families of the Kingdom of Guatemala. who, therefore, have obtained the main political and military jobs. Their wealth consisted mainly of valuable estates of livestock. But that wasn't enough to provide their favorite son with a good education. Tegucigalpa lacked good schools, the only ones available were supported by private donations. Given this situation, Jose Antonio del Valle had to move his family to Guatemala City, where he hoped young Jose would be better formed. Jose Cecilio was only 9 years old when he arrived in Guatemala.

Education
In Guatemala City he attended the University of San Carlos where he earned a bachelor's degree in 1794. Then in 1799 he earned a degree in civil and canonical law and a licentiate degree in law in 1803. His mentor was Father José Antonio Liendo y Goycochea.

Politics
In 1821 he was elected mayor of Guatemala City, position he held until June (1821). The same year Central America became independent from Spanish rule. Jose del Valle was the one who wrote the Act of Independence of Central America. Up to this date, there is a controversy in relation to this document because del Valle did not sign it. Most historians however, agreed that he was not supposed to sign such document. In 1822 Central America became part of the short lived Mexican Empire under Agustin de Iturbide.

Valle was elected a 'Guatemalan Representative' before the Mexican Congress. On August 27, 1822. Valle was imprisoned along with other representatives on charges of conspiring against the Mexicans.
After months in prison (February 1823), he was released and appointed Foreign Minister for the Mexican Government. The same year Central America gained its independence from Mexico. In January 1824 he returned to Guatemala where was part of the second triumvirate that governed the Provinces of Central America.

In 1825 José del Valle ran for president of the Federal Republic of Central America against Manuel José Arce. Apparently won the election after he obtained more votes. But Congress had a different interpretation. The candidates went to second round and Arce was declared winner. Following his defeat, Valle retired from politics and devoted himself to writing.

In 1830 President Francisco Morazán offered him to be ambassador to France, and or the Vice presidency. He declined both and instead went on to become Director of the Economic Society and Director of San Carlos University's Fine Arts department.

Correspondence
Jeremy Bentham and Valle corresponded.  Before his death, Bentham sent a lock of his hair to Valle.

Death
In 1834 he defeated incumbent Francisco Morazán in the general election but never took over the presidency. He died on the road that leads from the farm "La Concepción" to Guatemala City, on March 2, 1834. Where he was supposed to be treated for an illness. The government decreed three days of mourning after his death. His death was marked by national mourning and bells tolling throughout the Republic, as he was one of the few prominent figures respected by Liberals and Conservatives alike.

Legacy

The Honduran Government awards a medal for distinguished service named "Orden Civil José Cecilio del Valle", and there is a University named after him in Tegucigalpa.

The November 22	is holiday because of his Birthday.

Honduras has featured Valle on its 100 Lempira banknote since 1951.

A later family member of Jose Cecilo was Jorge Del Valle Zamora and was ambassador of Honduras to Mexico in the 20th century.

See also
History of Central America

Further reading
 Jonathan Harris, 'An English utilitarian looks at Spanish American independence: Jeremy Bentham's Rid Yourselves of Ultramaria', The Americas 53 (1996), 217-33
 John Lynch, The Spanish American Revolutions 1808-1826 (New York: W.W. Norton, 1986, 2nd ed.)
 Miriam Williford, Jeremy Bentham on Spanish America (Baton Rouge: Louisiana State University Press, 1980)

References

External links

José Cecilio del Valle: político de la Independencia, Universidad Francisco Marroquin
JOSE CECILIO DEL VALLE (Biography Spanish)

1780 births
1834 deaths
Honduran politicians
Mayors of Guatemala City
Mexican Secretaries of Foreign Affairs
Heads of state of the Federal Republic of Central America
People from Choluteca Department
Central American independence activists
Conservatism in Guatemala
Elected officials who died without taking their seats